Subdivisions of the Second Polish Republic became an issue immediately after the creation of the Second Polish Republic in 1918. The Polish–Lithuanian Commonwealth had been partitioned in the late 18th century. Various parts of new Polish territory had belonged to different administrative structures of Austrian Empire, Imperial Germany and Russian Empire.

In 1919 the first voivodeships of interwar Poland were created; in addition, the capital of Warsaw had a status of an independent city-voivodeship. In the years 1919–1921 additional voivodeships were created, as borders of Poland were still fluid, with events such as the Silesian Uprisings in the West and Polish-Soviet War in the East. Eventually by 1921 Poland would have 15 voivodeships, Warsaw capital city-voivodeship and the Autonomous Silesian Voivodeship (the system known as 15+1+1). Additionally, creation of the new Sandomierz Voivodeship was planned for late 1939.

The lower level of administration, below voivodeships, were powiats (counties). They were subject to several reforms, particularly in early and late 1930s. Below them were gminas and gromadas. Shortly before the Second World War, in April 1939, Poland had 264 powiats, 611 urban and 3195 rural gminas and 40533 gromads.

The division was based on the three-tier system. On the lowest rung were the gminy, which were little more than local town and village governments. These were then grouped together into powiaty which were then arranged into województwa.

On April 1, 1938, borders of several western Voivodeships changed considerably. For more information, see Territorial changes of Polish Voivodeships on April 1, 1938.

Polish Voivodeships 1919–1939

Total number of Voivodeships - 16, plus the capital city of Warsaw, which was regarded as a separate unit.

Biggest Voivodeships (as for August 1, 1939)

 Polesie Voivodeship - area 36 668 km²
 Volhynian Voivodeship - area 35 754 km²
 Warszawa Voivodeship - area 31 656 km²

Smallest Voivodeships (as for August 1, 1939)

 miasto stołeczne Warszawa (the capital city of Warsaw) - area 141 km²
 Silesian Voivodeship - area 5 122 km²
 Tarnopol Voivodeship - area 16 533 km²

Most populous Voivodeships

 Lwów Voivodeship - pop. 3 126 300,
 Kielce Voivodeship - pop. 2 671 000,
 Łódź Voivodeship - pop. 2 650 100.

Least populous Voivodeships

 Nowogródek Voivodeship - pop. 1 057 200,
 Polesie Voivodeship - pop. 1 132 200,
 miasto stołeczne Warszawa (the capital city of Warsaw) - pop. 1 179 500.

Polish Counties 1919–1939

Total number of counties (as for August 1, 1939) - 264, including 23 urban counties.

Biggest counties (as for August 1, 1939)

 Wilno – Troki county (area 5 967 km²),
 Łuniniec county (area 5 722 km²),
 Kowel county (area 5 682 km²).

Smallest counties (as for August 1, 1939)

 Warszawa-Srodmiescie (mid-Warsaw) (area 10 km²),
 city of Bielsko (area 10 km²),
 city of Gniezno (area 18 km²).

Most populous counties

 city of Łódź county (pop. 604 600),
 Warszawa-North county (pop. 478 200),
 Katowice county, (pop. 357 300).

Least populous counties

 city of Bielsko county, (pop. 25 400),
 city of Gniezno, (pop. 30 700),
 Międzychód county, (pop. 31 000).

Sources

 Mały rocznik statystyczny 1939, Nakładem Głównego Urzędu Statystycznego, Warszawa 1939 (Concise Statistical Year-Book of Poland, Warsaw 1939).

Second Polish Republic
Former subdivisions of Poland

it:Seconda Repubblica di Polonia#Divisione amministrativa e geografia